The Haiti women's national under-17 football team represents Haiti in international football for women at this age level and is controlled by the Fédération Haïtienne de Football (FHF).

History 
The team faced a number of challenges. The 2010 earthquake was a major one, with the management wondering if the team would be able to compete internationally, as a result of a range of issues including many players dealing with bereavement and the death of their parents.  There was also fear by the national federation that any offers to train overseas would lead to players leaving the squad to live in the host country.

Competitions 
The team won 19–0 against French Guiana in a 2013 qualifying match for the FIFA Women's U-17 World Cup.  In the lead up to that competition, the team played a warmup match against a team of Haitian referees in honor of International Women's Day.  They played a friendly against the Haitian women's national under-15 team in 2014, winning 2 – 1.

The team participated in the 2017 USA Cup in July.  Their participation was facilitated by a grant from the United States government.  The team was using the competition as an opportunity to train ahead of the start of regional World Cup qualification scheduled to get underway in October 2017. They came away from the competition victorious, winning seven games in a row.  Their final game was against a side from St. Paul, Minnesota with Bethina, Sheelove, Tabita, Nancy, and Madelina  each contributing goals in their 6–2 win.

Competitive record

FIFA U-17 Women's World Cup

CONCACAF Women's U-17 Championship

Roster

See also

Haiti women's national football team
Haiti women's national under-20 football team

References

u17
Women's national under-17 association football teams